"Promised Land" is a collaboration between producer/composer/singer/guitarist Marc Mysterio, rock band Crash Test Dummies and Mark Crozer meant to honor and benefit the International Federation of Red Cross and Red Crescent Societies whose resources, doctors, nurses and lawyers were severely stressed -- to near breaking point -- by the influx of refugees descending upon Europe in 2015. Mysterio and Crash Test Dummies previously collaborated in March 2015, when Mysterio released a remix of the band's 1993 hit Mmm Mmm Mmm Mmm.

On February 5, 2016, 'Promised Land' was released by Sony Music, marking the band's first major label release of new material in nearly two decades.

Personnel
Mark Crozer, guitars, bass, drums, piano
Marc Mysterio, vocals
Brad Roberts, vocals

Music video
The music video for the song consists of shots of refugees across Europe, including a subtitled interview with one of them.

References

External links

2015 singles
Crash Test Dummies songs
2015 songs
Charity singles